Family Affair is an album by the Bear Quartet, released in 1993.

Track listing
"Carsick" – 3:35
"Big Stretch" – 2:42
"Revisited" – 3:37
"Slope Goings" – 1:30
"Who's Knocking" – 2:32
"Left on the Bank of the River" – 3:29
"Smallest" – 2:16
"Boss Dawn" – 1:26
"Cross Yawn" – 0:52
"Twinreceiver" – 4:22

1993 albums
The Bear Quartet albums